Brenda Warrington is a British Labour politician and was leader of Tameside Metropolitan Borough Council in Greater Manchester from 2018 to 2022. As leader she was also a member of the Greater Manchester Combined Authority and was the combined authority's portfolio lead for healthy lives & quality care. She was also, ex-officio, the Chair of the Greater Manchester Pension Fund which is managed by Tameside Metropolitan Borough Council.

First elected to the council in 2002, she represents the ward of Denton West and was elected leader of the council on 31 January 2018 following the sudden death of the predecessor Kieran Quinn the previous month. She was the first woman to hold the role. Warrington resigned as council leader on 17 May 2022 to avoid defeat in a leadership content that she described as a "hostile challenge" by her successor Ged Cooney.

References 

Living people
Labour Party (UK) councillors
Leaders of local authorities of England
Year of birth missing (living people)
Members of the Greater Manchester Combined Authority